Otto Friedrich Rudolf von Tavel (21 December 1866 – 18 October 1934 in Bern) was a Swiss journalist and writer. Many of his novels were written in Bernese rather than Standard German, and he is one of the best-known authors in that language.

Life 

Rudolf von Tavel was the youngest of six children of an old Bernese patrician family. He spent his youth in conservative circles of the city. He studied jurisprudence and cameralism in Lausanne, Leipzig, Berlin, and received his doctorate in Heidelberg in 1891. He then worked for the Berner Tagblatt (a forerunner of the Berner Zeitung) until 1916, and from 1896 to 1905 served as director of the Swiss Mobiliar insurance company. On 10 May 1894 he married Adele Stettler (1874-1966); the marriage was childless.

In the Swiss army, von Tavel obtained the rank of battalion commander. During the First World War he worked closely with Hermann Hesse in the care of prisoners of war. From 1902 to 1912 he was a member of the Bern city council (Stadtrat) for the Conservative-Democratic Party. He was a member of the Federation of Swiss Protestant Churches and several non-profit organizations.

From 1920 he lived as a freelance writer on his estate on the outskirts of Bern. He died of a stroke in 1934. His grave is in the Schosshalden cemetery. In 2003, the Rudolf von Tavel Foundation was established in Bern.

Publications

Von Tavel wrote predominantly in Bernese German, a dialect of the Alemannic language. His novels are still among the most widely read works in Swiss German. His collection is maintained in the Burgerbibliothek of Bern.

Novels and novellas 
«Jä gäll, so geit’s»: E luschtigi Gschicht uus truuriger Zyt, 1901
Der Houpme Lombach, 1903
Götti und Gotteli, 1906
Der Stärn vo Buebebärg: E Gschicht us de trüebschte Tage vom alte Bärn, 1907
D’Frou Kätheli und ihri Buebe, 1910
Gueti Gschpane, 1913
Der Donnergueg: E Liebesgschicht us stille Zyte, 1916
Die heilige Flamme: Eine Erzählung aus dem Bernerland, 1917 (hochdeutsch)
Heinz Tillmann, 1919 (Standard German)
D’Haselmuus: E Gschicht us em Undergang vom alte Bärn, 1922
Unspunne: Wie’s der Haselmuus wyter ergangen isch, 1924
Ds verlorne Lied, 1926
Veteranezyt, 1927
Der Frondeur: Berndeutscher Roman aus dem 17. Jahrhundert, 1929
Ring i der Chetti: E Läbesgschicht, 1931
Meischter und Ritter, 1933

Short stories 
D' Glogge vo Nüechterswyl: E Gschicht usem Bärnbiet, 1917
Bernbiet: Alte und neue Erzählungen, 1918 (Standard German)
Simeon und Eisi, 1922
Am Kaminfüür: Bärndütschi Gschichte, 1928
Amors Rache, 1930
Schweizer daheim und draussen: Novellen, 1932
Uf d Liebi chunnt's alleini a: Mit Rudolf von Tavel in das 18. Jahrhundert, 2007 (story collection, with glossary)

Plays 
Di gfreutischti Frou: E Komedi i 3 Akte, 1923
Zwöierlei Schatzig: Bauernkomödie in 2 Aufzügen, 1926

Non-fiction 
Die wichtigsten Änderungen in der Lebenshaltung der schweizerischen Hochgebirgsbewohner im Laufe des XIX. Jahrhunderts. Eine wirtschaftspolitische Abhandlung, dissertation, Heidelberg 1891
Theodorich von Lerber: Ein Lebensbild, 1911
Bern, seinen Besuchern geschildert, 1914
Von grosser Arbeit: Kraftwerk und Stausee von Mühleberg in ihrer Entstehung, 1921
Kraft und Herrlichkeit: Festschrift auf die Feier des neunzigjährigen Bestehens des Diakonissenhauses Bern-Bad Ems und "Jerusalem" Hamburg, 1934
Vom Wert der Tradition, 1935

References

External links 

 Rudolf von Tavel at the Hathi Trust Digital Library
 Rudolf von Tavel in the German Wikisource
 
 
 

Swiss journalists
1866 births
1934 deaths
Swiss literature
Swiss writers
Alemannic German language
Writers from Bern